"Lollipop Pt. 2" is a song recorded by South Korean group Big Bang for to promote a cellphone by LG Cyon. The recording also was released as their sixth digital single on February 19, 2010, by YG Entertainment. It was produced by Teddy and co-written with G-Dragon and T.O.P. The song peaked at number three on the Gaon Digital Chart, with 1,337,098 copies sold in the year of 2010.

Background
BigBang collaborated with their labelmate 2NE1 a year before, in the release of the promotional single "Lollipop", released on March 27, 2009, and created to promote a cellphone by LG Cyon. In February, 2010 it was announced that BigBang would collaborate with LG Cyon Electronics again, this time only the group and returning with a digital single entitled "Lollipop 2", with date scheduled for the beginning of the month.

Track listing

Charts

Sales

References

BigBang (South Korean band) songs
YG Entertainment singles
Korean-language songs
Songs written by Teddy Park
Songs written by G-Dragon
Songs written by T.O.P
2010 singles
2010 songs